Hohenahr is a municipality in the Lahn-Dill-Kreis in Hesse, Germany.

Geography

Location
Hohenahr lies in the Lahn-Dill Highland at a height of between 260 and 440 m above sea level. Its constituent communities of Ahrdt and Mudersbach are on the shores of the Aartalsee (lake).

Neighbouring communities
Hohenahr borders in the north on the community of Bischoffen (Lahn-Dill-Kreis), in the east on the community of Biebertal (Gießen district), in the south on the town of Wetzlar, in the southwest on the town of Aßlar, and in the west on the community of Mittenaar (all in the Lahn-Dill-Kreis).

Constituent communities
The centres of Ahrdt, Altenkirchen, Erda (administrative seat), Großaltenstädten, Hohensolms and Mudersbach are all part of the community.

History
The constituent community of Erda had its first documentary mention in 771. It is supposed, however, that the constituent community of Altenkirchen, with its much older church, is some years older than Erda and that owing to its smallness was not mentioned earlier. In the 14th century, the Counts of Solms built Hohensolms Castle.

As part of Hesse's municipal reforms, the constituent communities of Erda, Hohensolms and Ahrdt first merged voluntarily in 1972, followed a few months later by Großaltenstädten. Altenkirchen and Mudersbach were amalgamated with the greater community in 1977 by state law.

Politics

Municipal council

The municipal elections on 26 March 2006 yielded the following results:

Note: The FWG citizens' coalition lost both its seats from the 2001 election to the CDU.

Coat of arms
Hohenahr's civic coat of arms might heraldically be described thus: In Or an oak azure with six leaves and three acorns gules overlaid below with a concave point gules, therein a lion's head Or.

The thickly wooded community lies in the area of the former Solms Counties, which gave the arms the gold and blue. The six oak leaves stand for Hohenahr's six constituent communities.

References

External links

Lahn-Dill-Kreis